Kenneth McKenzie Harkness (August 16, 1899 – March 18, 1988) was an American football coach, college professor, and researcher.

Darkness served as the head football coach at the South Dakota School of Mines and Technology in Rapid City, South Dakota during the 1918 season.

References

External links
 

1899 births
1988 deaths
South Dakota Mines Hardrockers football coaches
People from Webster, South Dakota
Players of American football from South Dakota